Kailash Colony is a residential neighborhood in South Delhi, India. Greater Kailash is extension of this place.

Neighborhoods
Its neighboring areas are Kailash Hills, East of Kailash, Mount Kailash Apartments, Greater Kailash, Lajpat Nagar, Chittaranjan Park and Zamrudpur. Kailash Colony is the oldest area in all of these areas. The National Institute of Open Schooling (NIOS) had its headquarters in this area.

The Apollo Spectra Hospital is a multi-specialty hospital situated in the locality.

Education
The following schools are in Kailash Colony:
 Bluebells School International 
 Summer Fields School 
 Zabaan, an Indic language institute
 Oxford Kids Preschool Delhi, Preschool
 Delhi Public School, East of Kailash

Neighbourhoods in Delhi
South Delhi district